Stoneham High School is a comprehensive, four-year public school located in Stoneham, Massachusetts, United States, that offers a range of Comprehensive to Advanced Placement Program courses. 
Accredited by the New England Association of Schools and Colleges, its 71-member faculty has earned 55 Master's degrees and has an average of 15 years of experience. As members of the Middlesex League, Stoneham High School student-athletes compete in 20 varsity sports.

Academics

Seven classes are scheduled with six blocks meeting each day; periods are 57 minutes long. 
The Superintendent of Stoneham Schools is John Macero. The assistant principal is Craig Murray. The Program Supervisor of Guidance is Nicole Dillon and the five guidance counselors are Celeste Vaughan, Kristin Ronayne, and Kristen Polizzoto (formerly Ms. Kristen Hoar). SHS offers Advanced Placement Program courses in French, Spanish, Italian, Biology, History, Chemistry, Studio Art, Physics, Calculus and Psychology, English.

Athletics
Stoneham is a member of the Massachusetts Interscholastic Athletic Association and the Middlesex League.

Sports:

Fall
 Boys and Girls Cross Country
 Boys and Girls Swimming
 Golf
 Field Hockey
 Football
 Girls Volleyball
 Boy and Girls Soccer
 Cheerleading
 Winter
 Boys and Girls Indoor Track
 Boys and Girls Basketball
 Boys Hockey
 Girls Gymnastics
 Spring
 Boys and Girls Outdoor Track
 Baseball
 Boys and Girls Tennis
 Softball
 Lacrosse

Performing arts
The Drama Club, puts on three productions each year; one in the fall, a 40-minute piece in the winter (which they bring to the Massachusetts High School Drama Guild One-Act Festival), and a musical in the spring. The drama club is completely student run, only having faculty/adult supervision and direction courtesy of Mr. Sean Perry.

They went to the state finals in March–April 2014 for their adaptation of the stage version of Spring Awakening, starring Alyssa Bené as Wendla and Liam Rondeau as Moritz. Many members of the cast and crew won awards for their work in this production, such as Troy Degnan, and Edward Ye. They also attended state finals again in March–April 2017 for their adaptation of "Kindertransport". Dalilah Degen-Portnoy,
Daria Contino, and Casey Moriarty all won awards for their acting performance, as well as other awards in crew, and a stage manager award to Peter Canova.

The Drama Club also made it to the semi finals round in 2019 with their performance of The Yellow Boat starring John Pagliarulo as Benjamin, Grace Gil as Mother, Ross Blauvelt as Father, and Stephen Landers as Eddie. During the shows run Grace Gill, John Pagliarulo, and Stephen Landers won acting awards and Molly McNulty and Stephen Landers won awards for props design. At their annual Carnival Ball in 2014, the Stoneham High School House Band led by Jimmy DiTullio (Jimes Tooper) played a variety of Disney hits.

Demographics
The racial makeup of Stoneham High School is: 95% White, 3% Black, 1% Hispanic and 1% Asian/American Indian.

Notable alumni

 Quincy Brisco: comedian and media personality
 Mario Cantone: comedian and actor
 Sandro Corsaro: American animator and author
 Charles Gibbons: Speaker of the Massachusetts House of Representatives and 1958 candidate for governor
 Josh Gondelman:  actor, comedy writer, and stand-up comedian
 George J. Hall: U.S. Army soldier and Medal of Honor recipient in World War II
 Chris J. Johnson: actor
 Nancy Kerrigan: two-time Olympic figure skating medalist
 Killer Kowalski: professional wrestler
 Joe McLaughlin: linebacker for the Green Bay Packers and New York Giants
 Bill Peirce: Libertarian candidate for Governor of Ohio in 2006.
 Joe Vitiello: Major League Baseball player from 1995–2003
 Steve Yarbrough: novelist

References 

Buildings and structures in Stoneham, Massachusetts
Educational institutions in the United States with year of establishment missing
Public high schools in Massachusetts
Schools in Middlesex County, Massachusetts